Heykuiyeh (also Romanized as Heykū’īyeh; also known as Heykūeeyeh) is a village in Horjand Rural District, Kuhsaran District, Ravar County, Kerman Province, Iran. At the 2006 census, its population was 122, in 34 families.

References 

Populated places in Ravar County